Dmitry Yuryevich Soin (born 7 August 1969) is a Transnistrian sociologist and politician.

Biography
Dmitry Soin was born on 7 August 1969 in the city of Tiraspol, in the Moldavian SSR of the Soviet Union. He fought in the Transnistria War and afterwards served in the Armed Forces of Transnistria from 1993 to 2007, retiring with the rank of lieutenant colonel.

In 1994, Moldovan authorities brought criminal charges of murder against Soin, who killed a Tiraspol resident with a service weapon in a claimed act of self-defense. Soin was declared an internationally wanted suspect by Interpol in 2004.

From 2010 to 2015, Soin was a member of the Supreme Council of Transnistria, representing his party, Proriv. He was also director of the Che Guevara School of Political Leadership.

In 2014, Soin moved to Moscow, Russia. Since 2018, Soin has been a Russian nationalist activist, a leader of the Russian All-People's Union and an ex-leader of the Rodina political party led by Sergey Baburin.

U.S. sanctions 
On 10 December 2021, the U.S. Department of the Treasury added Soin to its Specially Designated Nationals (SDN) list. Individuals on the list have their assets blocked and U.S. persons are generally prohibited from dealing with them.

References

External links
 Weapons Smuggling And Youth Cults In The Country That Doesn't Exist
 Ex-Soviet Region Feeling More Isolated
 TRANSNISTRIAN LEGISLATURE WILL FOCUS ON COOPERATION WITH RUSSIA, SOUTH OSSETIA AND ABKHAZIA
 TV debate between Russia's presidential candidates on Channel One
 2015 Nations in Transit Report on Moldova

Living people
Transnistrian people
1969 births
Specially Designated Nationals and Blocked Persons List